Monique Adamczak and Storm Sanders were the defending champions, but both players chose not to participate.

Alicja Rosolska and Abigail Spears won the title, defeating Mihaela Buzărnescu and Heather Watson in the final, 6–3, 7–6(7–5).

Seeds

Draw

Draw

References
Main Draw

Nottingham Open - Doubles
2018 Women's Doubles
2018 Nottingham Open